Pest control is the regulation or management of a species defined as a pest; any animal, plant or fungus that impacts adversely on human activities or environment. The human response depends on the importance of the damage done and will range from tolerance, through deterrence and management, to attempts to completely eradicate the pest. Pest control measures may be performed as part of an integrated pest management strategy.

In agriculture, pests are kept at bay by mechanical, cultural, chemical and biological means. Ploughing and cultivation of the soil before sowing mitigate the pest burden, and crop rotation helps to reduce the build-up of a certain pest species. Concern about environment means limiting the use of pesticides in favour of other methods. This can be achieved by monitoring the crop, only applying pesticides when necessary, and by growing varieties and crops which are resistant to pests. Where possible, biological means are used, encouraging the natural enemies of the pests and introducing suitable predators or parasites.

In homes and urban environments, the pests are the rodents, birds, insects and other organisms that share the habitat with humans, and that feed on and/or spoil possessions. Control of these pests is attempted through exclusion or quarantine, repulsion, physical removal or chemical means. Alternatively, various methods of biological control can be used including sterilisation programmes.

History

Pest control is at least as old as agriculture, as there has always been a need to keep crops free from pests. As long ago as 3000 BC in Egypt, cats were used to control pests of grain stores such as rodents. Ferrets were domesticated by 1500 BC in Europe for use as mousers. Mongooses were introduced into homes to control rodents and snakes, probably by the ancient Egyptians.

The conventional approach was probably the first to be employed, since it is comparatively easy to destroy weeds by burning them or ploughing them under, and to kill larger competing herbivores. Techniques such as crop rotation, companion planting (also known as intercropping or mixed cropping), and the selective breeding of pest-resistant cultivars have a long history.

Chemical pesticides were first used around 2500 BC, when the Sumerians used sulphur compounds as insecticides. Modern pest control was stimulated by the spread across the United States of the Colorado potato beetle. After much discussion, arsenical compounds were used to control the beetle and the predicted poisoning of the human population did not occur. This led the way to a widespread acceptance of insecticides across the continent. With the industrialisation and mechanization of agriculture in the 18th and 19th centuries, and the introduction of the insecticides pyrethrum and derris, chemical pest control became widespread. In the 20th century, the discovery of several synthetic insecticides, such as DDT, and herbicides boosted this development.

The harmful side effect of pesticides on humans has now resulted in the development of newer approaches, such as the use of biological control to eliminate the ability of pests to reproduce or to modify their behavior to make them less troublesome. Biological control is first recorded around 300 AD in China, when colonies of weaver ants, Oecophylla smaragdina, were intentionally placed in citrus plantations to control beetles and caterpillars. Also around 4000 BC in China, ducks were used in paddy fields to consume pests, as illustrated in ancient cave art. In 1762, an Indian mynah was brought to Mauritius to control locusts, and about the same time, citrus trees in Burma were connected by bamboos to allow ants to pass between them and help control caterpillars. In the 1880s, ladybirds were used in citrus plantations in California to control scale insects, and other biological control experiments followed. The introduction of DDT, a cheap and effective compound, put an effective stop to biological control experiments. By the 1960s, problems of resistance to chemicals and damage to the environment began to emerge, and biological control had a renaissance. Chemical pest control is still the predominant type of pest control today, although a renewed interest in traditional and biological pest control developed towards the end of the 20th century and continues to this day.

In agriculture, horticulture, and forestry

Control methods

Biological pest control

Biological pest control is a method of controlling pests such as insects and mites by using other organisms. It relies on predation, parasitism, herbivory, parasitody or other natural mechanisms, but typically also involves an active human management role. Classical biological control involves the introduction of natural enemies of the pest that are bred in the laboratory and released into the environment. An alternative approach is to augment the natural enemies that occur in a particular area by releasing more, either in small, repeated batches, or in a single large-scale release. Ideally, the released organism will breed and survive, and provide long-term control. Biological control can be an important component of an integrated pest management programme.

For example: mosquitoes are often controlled by putting Bt Bacillus thuringiensis ssp. israelensis, a bacterium that infects and kills mosquito larvae, in local water sources.

Cultural control

Mechanical pest control is the use of hands-on techniques as well as simple equipment and devices, that provides a protective barrier between plants and insects. This is referred to as tillage and is one of the oldest methods of weed control as well as being useful for pest control; wireworms, the larvae of the common click beetle, are very destructive pests of newly ploughed grassland, and repeated cultivation exposes them to the birds and other predators that feed on them.

Crop rotation can help to control pests by depriving them of their host plants. It is a major tactic in the control of corn rootworm, and has reduced early season incidence of Colorado potato beetle by as much as 95%.

Trap cropping

A trap crop is a crop of a plant that attracts pests, diverting them from nearby crops. Pests aggregated on the trap crop can be more easily controlled using pesticides or other methods. However, trap-cropping, on its own, has often failed to cost effectively reduce pest densities on large commercial scales, without the use of pesticides, possibly due to the pests' ability to disperse back into the main field.

Pesticides

Pesticides are applied to crops by agricultural aircraft, tractor-mounted crop sprayers, aerial spray by modern aircraft or as seed dressings to control pests. However, successful control by pesticides is not easy; the right formulation must be chosen, the timing is often critical, the method of application is important, adequate coverage and retention on the crop are necessary. The killing of natural enemies of the target pest should be minimized. This is particularly important in countries where there are natural reservoirs of pests and their enemies in the countryside surrounding plantation crops, and these co-exist in a delicate balance. Often in less-developed countries, the crops are well adapted to the local situation and no pesticides are needed. Where progressive farmers are using fertilizers to grow improved crop varieties, these are often more susceptible to pest damage, but the indiscriminate application of pesticides may be detrimental in the longer term.

The efficacy of chemical pesticides tends to diminish over time. This is because any organism that manages to survive the initial application will pass on its genes to its offspring and a resistant strain will be developed. In this way, some of the most serious pests have developed resistance and are no longer killed by pesticides that used to kill their ancestors. This necessitates higher concentrations of chemical, more frequent applications and a movement to more expensive formulations.

Pesticides are formulated to kill pests, but many have detrimental effects on non-target species; of particular concern is the damage done to honey-bees, solitary bees and other pollinating insects and in this regard, the time of day when the spray is applied can be important. The widely used neonicotinoids have been banned on flowering crops in some countries because of their effects on bees. Some pesticides may cause cancer and other health problems in humans, as well as being harmful to wildlife. There can be acute effects immediately after exposure or chronic effects after continuous low-level, or occasional exposure. Maximum residue limits for pesticides in foodstuffs and animal feed are set by many nations.

Hunting

Pest control can also be achieved via culling the pest animals — generally small- to medium-sized wild or feral mammals or birds that inhabit the ecological niches near farms, pastures or other human settlements — by employing human hunters or trappers to physically track down, kill and remove them from the area.  The culled animals, known as vermin, may be targeted because they are deemed harmful to agricultural crops, livestock or facilities; serve as hosts or vectors that transmit pathogens across species or to humans; or for population control as a mean of protecting other vulnerable species and ecosystems.

Pest control via hunting, like all forms of harvest, has imposed an artificial selective pressure on the organisms being targeted.  While varmint hunting is potentially selecting for desired behavioural and demographic changes (e.g. animals avoiding human populated areas, crops and livestock), it can also result in unpredicted outcomes such as the targeted animal adapting for faster reproductive cycles.

Forestry

Forest pests present a significant problem because it is not easy to access the canopy and monitor pest populations. In addition, forestry pests such as bark beetles, kept under control by natural enemies in their native range, may be transported large distances in cut timber to places where they have no natural predators, enabling them to cause extensive economic damage. Pheromone traps have been used to monitor pest populations in the canopy. These release volatile chemicals that attract males. Pheromone traps can detect the arrival of pests or alert foresters to outbreaks. For example, the spruce budworm, a destructive pest of spruce and balsam fir, has been monitored using pheromone traps in Canadian forests for several decades. In some regions, such as New Brunswick, areas of forest are sprayed with pesticide to control the budworm population and prevent the damage caused during outbreaks.

In homes and cities

Many unwelcome animals visit or make their home in residential buildings, industrial sites and urban areas. Some contaminate foodstuffs, damage structural timbers, chew through fabrics or infest stored dry goods. Some inflict great economic loss, others carry diseases or cause fire hazards, and some are just a nuisance. Control of these pests has been attempted by improving sanitation and garbage control, modifying the habitat, and using repellents, growth regulators, traps, baits and pesticides.

General methods

Physical pest control

Physical pest control involves trapping or killing pests such as insects and rodents. Historically, local people or paid rat-catchers caught and killed rodents using dogs and traps. On a domestic scale, sticky flypapers are used to trap flies. In larger buildings, insects may be trapped using such means as pheromones, synthetic volatile chemicals or ultraviolet light to attract the insects; some have a sticky base or an electrically charged grid to kill them. Glueboards are sometimes used for monitoring cockroaches and to catch rodents. Rodents can be killed by suitably baited spring traps and can be caught in cage traps for relocation. Talcum powder or "tracking powder" can be used to establish routes used by rodents inside buildings and acoustic devices can be used for detecting beetles in structural timbers.

Historically, firearms have been one of the primary methods used for pest control. "Garden Guns" are smooth bore shotguns specifically made to fire .22 caliber snake shot or 9mm Flobert, and are commonly used by gardeners and farmers for snakes, rodents, birds, and other pest. Garden Guns are short-range weapons that can do little harm past 15 to 20 yards, and they're relatively quiet when fired with snake shot, compared to standard ammunition. These guns are especially effective inside of barns and sheds, as the snake shot will not shoot holes in the roof or walls, or more importantly, injure livestock with a ricochet. They are also used for pest control at airports, warehouses, stockyards, etc.

The most common shot cartridge is .22 Long Rifle loaded with #12 shot. Special smoothbore shotguns, such as the Marlin Model 25MG can produce effective patterns out to 15 or 20 yards using .22 WMR shotshells, which hold 1/8 oz. of #12 shot contained in a plastic capsule.

Poisoned bait

Poisoned bait is a common method for controlling rats, mice, birds, slugs, snails, ants, cockroaches, and other pests. The basic granules, or other formulation, contains a food attractant for the target species and a suitable poison. For ants, a slow-acting toxin is needed so that the workers have time to carry the substance back to the colony, and for flies, a quick-acting substance to prevent further egg-laying and nuisance. Baits for slugs and snails often contain the molluscide metaldehyde, dangerous to children and household pets.

An article in Scientific American in 1885 described effective elimination of a cockroach infestation using fresh cucumber peels.

Warfarin has traditionally been used to kill rodents, but many populations have developed resistance to this anticoagulant, and difenacoum may be substituted. These are cumulative poisons, requiring bait stations to be topped up regularly. Poisoned meat has been used for centuries to kill animals such as wolves and birds of prey. Poisoned carcasses however kill a wide range of carrion feeders, not only the targeted species. Raptors in Israel were nearly wiped out following a period of intense poisoning of rats and other crop pests.

Fumigation

Fumigation is the treatment of a structure to kill pests such as wood-boring beetles by sealing it or surrounding it with an airtight cover such as a tent, and fogging with liquid insecticide for an extended period, typically of 24–72 hours. This is costly and inconvenient as the structure cannot be used during the treatment, but it targets all life stages of pests.

An alternative, space treatment, is fogging or misting to disperse a liquid insecticide in the atmosphere within a building without evacuation or airtight sealing, allowing most work within the building to continue, at the cost of reduced penetration. Contact insecticides are generally used to minimize long-lasting residual effects.

Sterilization
Populations of pest insects can sometimes be dramatically reduced by the release of sterile individuals. This involves the mass rearing of a pest, sterilising it by means of X-rays or some other means, and releasing it into a wild population. It is particularly useful where a female only mates once and where the insect does not disperse widely. This technique has been successfully used against the New World screw-worm fly, some species of tsetse fly, tropical fruit flies, the pink bollworm and the codling moth, among others.

Laboratory studies conducted with U-5897 (3-chloro-1,2-propanediol) were attempted in the early 1970s for rat control, although these proved unsuccessful. In 2013, New York City tested sterilization traps, demonstrating a 43% reduction in rat populations. The product ContraPest was approved for the sterilization of rodents by the United States Environmental Protection Agency in August 2016.

Insulation
Boron, a known pesticide can be impregnated into the paper fibers of cellulose insulation at certain levels to achieve a mechanical kill factor for self-grooming insects such as ants, cockroaches, termites, and more. The addition of insulation into the attic and walls of a structure can provide control of common pests in addition to known insulation benefits such a robust thermal envelope and acoustic noise-canceling properties. The EPA regulates this type of general-use pesticide within the United States allowing it to only be sold and installed by licensed pest management professionals as part of an integrated pest management program. Simply adding Boron or an EPA-registered pesticide to an insulation does not qualify it as a pesticide. The dosage and method must be carefully controlled and monitored.

Methods for specific pests

Rodent control

Urban rodent control
Rodent control is vital in cities. New York City and cities across the state dramatically reduced their rodent populations in the early 1970s. Rio de Janeiro claims a reduction of 80% over only 2 years shortly thereafter. To better target efforts, London began scientifically surveying populations in 1972 and this was so useful that all Local Authorities in England and Wales soon followed.

Natural rodent control

Several wildlife rehabilitation organizations encourage natural form of rodent control through exclusion and predator support and preventing secondary poisoning altogether. The United States Environmental Protection Agency notes in its Proposed Risk Mitigation Decision for Nine Rodenticides that "without habitat modification to make areas less attractive to commensal rodents, even eradication will not prevent new populations from recolonizing the habitat." The United States Environmental Protection Agency has  prescribed guidelines for natural rodent control and for safe trapping in residential areas with subsequent release to the wild. People sometimes attempt to limit rodent damage using repellents. Balsam fir oil from the tree Abies balsamea is an EPA approved non-toxic rodent repellent. Acacia polyacantha subsp. campylacantha root emits chemical compounds that repel animals including rats.

Pantry pests

Insect pests including the Mediterranean flour moth, the Indian mealmoth, the cigarette beetle, the drugstore beetle, the confused flour beetle, the red flour beetle, the merchant grain beetle, the sawtoothed grain beetle, the wheat weevil, the maize weevil and the rice weevil infest stored dry foods such as flour, cereals and pasta.

In the home, foodstuffs found to be infested are usually discarded, and storing such products in sealed containers should prevent the problem from reoccurring. The eggs of these insects are likely to go unnoticed, with the larvae being the destructive life stage, and the adult the most noticeable stage.

Clothes moths

The larvae of clothes moths (mainly Tineola bisselliella and Tinea pellionella) feed on fabrics and carpets, particularly those that are stored or soiled. The adult females lay batches of eggs on natural fibres, including wool, silk, and fur, as well as cotton and linen in blends. The developing larvae spin protective webbing and chew into the fabric, creating holes and specks of excrement. Damage is often concentrated in concealed locations, under collars and near seams of clothing, in folds and crevices in upholstery and round the edges of carpets as well as under furniture. Methods of control include using airtight containers for storage, periodic laundering of garments, trapping, freezing, heating and the use of chemicals; mothballs contain volatile insect repellents such as 1,4-Dichlorobenzene which deter adults, but to kill the larvae, permethrin, pyrethroids or other insecticides may need to be used.

Carpet beetles
Carpet beetles are members of the family Dermestidae, and while the adult beetles feed on nectar and pollen, the larvae are destructive pests in homes, warehouses, and museums. They feed on animal products including wool, silk, leather, fur, the bristles of hair brushes, pet hair, feathers, and museum specimens. They tend to infest hidden locations and may feed on larger areas of fabrics than do clothes moths, leaving behind specks of excrement and brown, hollow, bristly-looking cast skins. Management of infestations is difficult and is based on exclusion and sanitation where possible, resorting to pesticides when necessary. The beetles can fly in from outdoors and the larvae can survive on lint fragments, dust, and inside the bags of vacuum cleaners. In warehouses and museums, sticky traps baited with suitable pheromones can be used to identify problems, and heating, freezing, spraying the surface with insecticide, and fumigation will kill the insects when suitably applied. Susceptible items can be protected from attack by keeping them in clean airtight containers.

Bookworms
Books are sometimes attacked by cockroaches, silverfish, book mites, booklice, and various beetles which feed on the covers, paper, bindings and glue. They leave behind physical damage in the form of tiny holes as well as staining from their faeces. Book pests include the larder beetle, and the larvae of the black carpet beetle and the drugstore beetle which attack leather-bound books, while the common clothes moth and the brown house moth attack cloth bindings. These attacks are largely a problem with historic books, because modern bookbinding materials are less susceptible to this type of damage.

Evidence of attack may be found in the form of tiny piles of book-dust and specks of frass. Damage may be concentrated in the spine, the projecting edges of pages and the cover. Prevention of attack relies on keeping books in cool, clean, dry positions with low humidity, and occasional inspections should be made. Treatment can be by freezing for lengthy periods, but some insect eggs are very resistant and can survive for long periods at low temperatures.

Beetles

Various beetles in the Bostrichoidea superfamily attack the dry, seasoned wood used as structural timber in houses and to make furniture. In most cases, it is the larvae that do the damage; these are invisible from the outside of the timber but are chewing away at the wood in the interior of the item. Examples of these are the powderpost beetles, which attack the sapwood of hardwoods, and the furniture beetles, which attacks softwoods, including plywood. The damage has already been done by the time the adult beetles bore their way out, leaving neat round holes behind them. The first that a householder knows about the beetle damage is often when a chair leg breaks off or a piece of structural timber caves in. Prevention is through chemical treatment of the timber prior to its use in construction or in furniture manufacture.

Termites
Termites with colonies in close proximity to houses can extend their galleries underground and make mud tubes to enter homes. The insects keep out of sight and chew their way through structural and decorative timbers, leaving the surface layers intact, as well as through cardboard, plastic and insulation materials. Their presence may become apparent when winged insects appear and swarm in the home in spring. Regular inspection of structures by a trained professional may help detect termite activity before the damage becomes substantial.;  Inspection and monitoring of termites is important because termite alates (winged reproductives) may not always swarm inside a structure. Control and extermination is a professional job involving trying to exclude the insects from the building and trying to kill those already present. Soil-applied liquid termiticides provide a chemical barrier that prevents termites from entering buildings, and lethal baits can be used; these are eaten by foraging insects, and carried back to the nest and shared with other members of the colony, which goes into slow decline.

Mosquitoes

Mosquitoes are midge-like flies in the family Culicidae. Females of most species feed on blood and some act as vectors for malaria and other diseases. Historically they have been controlled by use of DDT and other chemical means, but since the adverse environmental effects of these insecticides have been realized, other means of control have been attempted. The insects rely on water in which to breed and the first line of control is to reduce possible breeding locations by draining marshes and reducing accumulations of standing water. Other approaches include biological control of larvae by the use of fish or other predators, genetic control, the introduction of pathogens, growth-regulating hormones, the release of pheromones and mosquito trapping.

On airfields

Birds are a significant hazard to aircraft, but it is difficult to keep them away from airfields. Several methods have been explored. Stunning birds by feeding them a bait containing stupefying substances has been tried, and it may be possible to reduce their numbers on airfields by reducing the number of earthworms and other invertebrates by soil treatment. Leaving the grass long on airfields rather than mowing it is also a deterrent to birds. Sonic nets are being trialled; these produce sounds that birds find distracting and seem effective at keeping birds away from affected areas.

Guidelines and legislation
Guidelines and legislation regarding the usage permitted methods of application and the storage conditions of pesticides and chemicals vary from country to country, often being legislated by each state of territory.

Australia

Australian Capital Territory (ACT)
Environment Protection Act 1997 ACT

New South Wales

South Australia
Pesticides Regulations 2003 SA Pursuant to Controlled Substances Act 1984 SA

Victoria
Health (Pest Control) Regulations 2002 Vic pursuant to the Health Act 1958 Vic

Western Australia
Health (Pesticide) Regulations 2011 WA pursuant to Health Act 1911 WA

India
The Insecticides Act 1968

Malaysia
Pesticide Act 1974

Singapore
Control of Vectors and Pesticides Act

United Kingdom
Prevention of Damage by Pests Act 1949

See also 
 Bee removal
 Electronic pest control
 Garden guns
 Nuisance wildlife management
 Rabbits in Australia
 Wildlife contraceptive

References

External links
 Pest Control and Pesticide Safety for Consumers